Špiro Mugoša Airport (Montenegrin: Aerodrom Špiro Mugoša), also known as Ćemovsko Polje Airport (Montenegrin: Aerodrom Ćemovsko Polje), is a small airport near the Montenegrin capital of Podgorica.

History
The airport once served as Podgorica's only airport, mainly for military use, and withstood heavy bombing during Bombing of Podgorica in World War II. It was named after People's Hero of Yugoslavia .

, and it is one of the five Montenegrin airports to feature a paved runway.

Since Podgorica Airport was built in the 1960s, Ćemovsko Polje Airport caters to the needs of general aviation, as its  runway cannot serve larger aircraft. Aero Clubs Špiro Mugosa and Krila Podgorice currently operate the airport, and organize parachuting, gliding, and other air sports activities and training.

See also
Airports of Montenegro

References
  AERODROMI u PDF formatu
 
  – IATA and ICAO codes
  – IATA, ICAO and DAFIF codes

Airports in Montenegro
Transport in Podgorica
Yugoslav Air Force bases